The 1963 Inter-Cities Fairs Cup Final was the final of the fifth Inter-Cities Fairs Cup. It was played on 12 June and 26 June 1963 between Dinamo Zagreb of Yugoslavia and Valencia CF of Spain.

Valencia claimed their second major European trophy as they successfully defended their title by winning the tie 4-1 on aggregate.

It was the first time in the competition that a team won both legs of the final.

Route to the final

Both finalists' second-round ties went to a play-off match. After drawing 2–2 on aggregate against Belgian side Royale Union Saint-Gilloise, Dinamo won the decisive replay 3–2. The replay was held at a neutral venue, the Gugl-Stadion in Linz, Austria. Meanwhile, holders Valencia blew a four-goal lead in the second leg away to Dunfermline Athletic–– a side managed by future Celtic boss Jock Stein–– which left the tie deadlocked at 6–6. Los Che won 1–0 in their replay, which was played at the neutral Estádio do Restelo in Lisbon. (This was before the institution of the away goals rule in UEFA competitions.)

Perhaps a bit unusually, the first three opponents that Valencia faced in the competition were all clubs from Scotland.

Match details

First leg

Second leg

See also
1962–63 Inter-Cities Fairs Cup
GNK Dinamo Zagreb in European football
Valencia CF in European football

References

RSSSF

2
Inter-Cities Fairs Cup Final 1963
Inter-Cities Fairs Cup Final 1963
Inter-Cities Fairs Cup Final 1963
1963
Inter-Cities Fairs Cup Final 1963
Inter-Cities Fairs Cup Final
Inter-Cities Fairs Cup Final
Sports competitions in Zagreb
1960s in Zagreb
June 1963 sports events in Europe